The Organization for Cooperation of Railways (OSJD or OSShD), was established as the equivalent of the International Union of Railways (UIC) to create and improve the coordination of international rail transport. Concerning especially the transports between Europe and Asia, it has helped develop cooperation between railway companies and with other international organisations. The members of this organisation created an international transport law.

History

At a conference in Sofia, Bulgaria, on 28 June 1956, the governmental ministers managing railway transport of Eastern bloc countries Albania, Bulgaria, Hungary, Vietnam, East Germany, China, North Korea, Mongolia, Poland, Romania, the USSR, and Czechoslovakia decided to establish a special inter-governmental organization, the executive body of which started operations in Warsaw, Poland, on 1 September 1957.

In contrast to Western European countries, railway links between OSShD member countries are characterized by long routes (8000 to 10,000 km), different and severe climatic zones, and two track gauge changes on a single route ( and  ). Focusing on collective resolution of railway transport problems, OSShD role has developed with new frontiers increasing freight transport times.

Transport between Europe and Asia is controlled by different regulations from Western Europe, such as the Agreement on Direct International Carriage of Passengers and Luggage by Rail and Procedure Instruction attached thereto (SMPS), Agreement on Direct International Goods Transport by Rail and Procedure Instruction attached thereto (SMGS), Rules of Reciprocal Use of Wagons in International Traffic (PPW) and Settlement procedures applied to the Agreement on Direct International Carriage of Passengers and Luggage by Rail (MPS) and Agreement on Direct International Goods Transport by Rail (MGS).

OSShD also improves the technical, legal and tariff compatibility between OSShD members and transport systems in Europe.

In 1990, OSShD consisted of 13 member countries (Albania, Bulgaria, Hungary, Vietnam, GDR, China, North Korea, Cuba, Mongolia, Poland, Romania, the USSR, and Czechoslovakia). In 1992, it was joined by the six newly independent states of Belarus, Latvia, Lithuania, Estonia, Moldova and Ukraine. The reunification of Germany influenced the participation of the former East-German Deutsche Reichsbahn, which took observer status.

In 1992 in Ulaanbaatar, a new Conference of Railway General Directors was formed. This encouraged between 1993 and 1995, seven countries to join: Azerbaijan, Georgia, Kazakhstan, Kyrgyzstan, Uzbekistan, Tajikistan and Turkmenistan. This created 24 active member countries in total.

In 1997, Iran joined the OSShD, with Germany, France, Greece and Finland joining as observers. Additional, 17 commercial members joined, including: Siemens, Alcatel, Plasser & Theurer, Intercontainer-Interfrigo, Kolmex, and TransManche Link/Eurotunnel.

On March 21, 2014, the South Korean railway company Korail was admitted to OSShD as affiliate member. 
On June 7, 2018, South Korea was admitted as full member to the OSShD, after an approval vote by North Korea. South Korea had asked for membership already in 2015, but was blocked by North Korea's veto. OSShD requires unanimity of the existing members to admit a new one.

Operations

Europe-Asia freight operations
The main theme of the OSShD is in the programme for perfecting railway links between Europe and Asia. The OSShD defines success as the increase in freight volume that can be achieved both by direct investment in technical equipment, and by rationalization and improvement of existing procedures and services. The major programme provisions were presented at international conferences and published in Schienen der Welt, 4, 1995. The freight and passenger volumes between Europe and Asia, and the major railway flows were defined within the implementation of this programme, taking into account the activities in Europe of UIC, UN, ECE Inland Transport Commission, and the Trans-European Main Line Railway Programme

Routes
Druzhba-Alashankou crossing point - in 1994, the Ministers of Transport of Russia, China, Uzbekistan, Turkmenistan, Kyrgyzstan and Tajikistan, approved the regional programme for development and use of the international railways via the border crossing-point Druzhba-Alashankou until the year 2000
Berlin-Warsaw-Minsk-Moscow corridor - in 1995, the Ministers of Transport of Belarus, Germany, Poland and Russia signed a cooperation agreement on modernization, reconstruction and development of the Berlin-Warsaw-Minsk-Moscow corridor
Korea-Germany freight train

Legal
Agreements on international freight communications and the Carriages of Goods by Rail (CIM), and new rules on transporting dangerous freight prepared by OSShD based on UN recommendations and the Regulations governing the International Carriage of Dangerous Goods by Rail (RID).

OSShD is also participating in preparation of the new convention on customs regulations in international railway freight within the framework of the UN ECE Inland Transport Commission to be presented at the UN ECE Inland Transport Commission forum in 1998.

Equipment

OSShD has created various technical standards, which allow each company's equipment to be attached to others, as well as specification for initially freight vehicles and then passenger carriages which each member could order to ensure cost efficiency/inter operation

OSShD is also works on technical problems of different push-pull devices, brakes, car sizes, etc.

Carriages
In 1962 the East German railway company Deutsche Reichsbahn introduced a new generation of 24.5m four-axle coaches, termed OSShD Type B (OSShD-B), on "Görlitz V" bogies.
 
From 1968 this was further developed to met UIC-standard, and became known as OSShD-Y. Built by VEB Waggonbau Bautzen or VEB Waggonbau Görlitz in East Germany, the 24.5m carriage was characteristic by its arched top, rather than the Type-B curved top. Supplied to all OSShD members, it was often the basis for the bulk of many OSShD members stock, as well as being sold on to other railway companies.

Future work
OSShD is presently working in the areas of
Specification of technical parameters for high-quality freight lines
Confirmation and simplification of legal regulations on procedures at frontiers related to transportation across Eurasian continent, delivery terms, financial responsibility, etc.
Creation of competitive conditions for acceptance and carriage of large freight volumes to improve OSShD members' financial conditions
Development of new forms of freight carriage by box freight trains from large-scale senders to large-scale receivers in shortest possible time at competitive prices

Members 

It currently has 26 full member states. 
 Albania 1957 
 Azerbaijan 1995 
  Belarus 1990   
 Bulgaria  1957
 China 1957 
  Cuba 1957 
 Czech Republic 1957 
 Estonia 1990 
 Georgia 1995  
 Hungary 1957 
 Iran - since 1997 
 Kazakhstan 1995  
 Korea (North) 1957 
 Korea (South) - since 2018 
 Kyrgyzstan 1995 
 Latvia 1990 
 Lithuania 1990 
 Moldova 1990 
 Mongolia 1957 
 Poland 1957 
 Romania 1957 
 Russian Federation 1957 
 Slovakia 1957 
 Tajikistan 1995  
 Turkmenistan 1995 
 Ukraine 1990 
 Uzbekistan 1995 
 Vietnam 1957.

There are four observers:
 Finland,
 France, 
 Germany, 
 Greece.

The route trackage of the full members in 2020 combined equals nearly 370,000 km or roughly a 28% of the world's railway trackage. In the former COMECON and some neighbouring nations, OSShD was the common railway standardization body and remains so today.

See also 

 China railway signalling
 Polish railway signalling
 German railway signalling
 Signal Aspects

Similar organisations 
 Association of American Railroads (AAR), an industry trade group representing the railroads of North America
 International Union of Railways (UIC)
 International Association of Public Transport (UITP), promotes passenger transport especially in cities
 Intergovernmental Organisation for International Carriage by Rail (OTIF)
 African Union of Railways (AUR)

References

External links
Organization for Cooperation of Railways official web site
OSShD—Organization for the Collaboration of Railways by Andrzej Golaszewski. Publisher: Japan Railway & Transport Review No. 14 (pp.27–29)
Intergovernmental Organisation for International Carriage by Rail
OSShD signal guide

International organisations or its agencies based in Warsaw
International rail transport organizations
Railway associations
Rail cooperatives
Railway signalling by country